The New Jersey Department of Human Services (DHS) is the largest state government agency in New Jersey, serving about 1.5 million New Jerseyans. DHS serves seniors, individuals and families with low incomes; people with developmental disabilities, or late-onset disabilities; people who are blind, visually impaired, deaf, hard of hearing, or deaf-blind; parents needing child care services, child support and/or healthcare for their children; and families facing catastrophic medical expenses for their children.
There is a New Jersey Department of Human Services Police.

Divisions
DHS consists of eight major divisions:
Commission for the Blind & Visually Impaired (CBVI)
Division of Aging Services (DoAS)
Division of the Deaf and Hard of Hearing (DDHH) 
Division of Developmental Disabilities (DDD) 
Division of Disability Services (DDS) 
Division of Family Development (DFD) 
Division of Medical Assistance & Health Services (DMAHS) 
Division of Mental Health and Addiction Services (DMHAS)

Allocated within DHS and operate administratively as units within it but are directed by a governing body:
Catastrophic Illness in Children Relief Fund (CICRF) 
Office on Autism 
Office for the Prevention of Developmental Disabilities (OPDD)

Offices performing administrative functions:
Office of Legal Affairs (OLA) 
Office of Program Integrity and Accountability (OPIA)
Office of Licensing (OOL) 
Office of Contract Policy and Management (OCPM) 
Office of Information Systems (OIS)

See also
Supplemental Nutrition Assistance Program
Governorship of Chris Christie
Governorship of Phil Murphy

References

External links 

Human Services
State-based welfare in the United States